Wouter Brouwer (10 August 1882 – 4 May 1961) was a Dutch fencer. He competed at three Olympic Games.

References

External links
 

1882 births
1961 deaths
Dutch male fencers
Olympic fencers of the Netherlands
Fencers at the 1920 Summer Olympics
Fencers at the 1924 Summer Olympics
Fencers at the 1928 Summer Olympics
Fencers from Amsterdam
20th-century Dutch people